Frontier City is a western-themed amusement park in Oklahoma City. It is owned by EPR and operated by Six Flags. The park originally opened in 1958. Frontier City is the third-oldest Six Flags park behind Six Flags New England and Six Flags Great Escape and Hurricane Harbor. Frontier City and La Ronde in Montreal, are the only two company parks not officially branded as Six Flags parks.

History

Burge/Williams era (1958–1981)
In 1958, the park opened along Route 66, now Interstate 35. It featured a haunted farm, mine train, robberies and jails. Initially, guests entered for free but paid a quarter to watch the gunfight shows. It started out as Boomtown, a replica of an Oklahoma pioneer town that was built for the state's semicentennial celebration in 1957 at the Oklahoma State Fair grounds. Jimmy Burge, leader of the committee that built it, decided to open an amusement park with the same theme. Rather than a traditional ribbon cutting, it was scheduled to have an old fashioned six shooter, aimed at a piece of rope stretched across the stockade entrance. That is the same manner used today for its opening. It added spinning rides, roller coasters, and a log flume ride starting in the 1960s and 1970s.

The park was originally owned and operated by Oklahoma City businessmen James Burge and Jack Williams. James Burge had been a publicist in Hollywood for twenty years, with clients that included Joan Crawford and Robert Taylor. He visited Disneyland when it opened in 1955 and was very impressed with the theme park business. Being from Oklahoma City, he knew his hometown would be a natural location for a western-themed amusement park. After World War II, he returned to Oklahoma City and later was appointed to lead the Oklahoma Semi-Centennial committee, which was planning the 1957 Oklahoma Semi-Centennial Exposition in Oklahoma City.

After the 1957 Exposition was over, he negotiated with the fair board to purchase many of the buildings and props at the "Boom Town" exhibit. Burge laid out the land and facilities with four initial investors, then entered a partnership with Jack Williams, a wealthy businessman who owned a chain of laundries; although Williams was initially interested in the park's linen rental contract, he was convinced by Burge's vision and became the principal investor. Together they developed the park as a recreation of an 1880s Western town. Russell Pearson was credited as the architect responsible for building designs and general layout. The four square blocks of streets contained a Marshall's office, saloon, bank, post office (with its own postmark), fire department, hotel and numerous storefronts. Attractions at the park included a train ride built by Arrow Dynamics, an authentic stagecoach ride, a donkey ride, and an indoor dark ride designed by Pearson, who later went on to work on Silver Dollar City in Branson, Missouri and Ghost Town in the Sky in Maggie Valley, North Carolina.

The park flourished during its first six seasons, reporting attendance of over one million people each year, although because parking and admission were free, attendance was determined by Burge from the number of train tickets sold, which could have counted the same people multiple times each day. It was famous for its live entertainment, including staged gunfights, Indian dancing, saloon shows, train robberies, and other similar types of Western experiences. The park made money by leasing concessions, and the concessionaires set their own prices; Burge recounted in 1988 that visitors "could walk around free unless [they] got thirsty". Williams set up the offices for his company and Frontier City staff in two surplus cabooses, purchased from the Frisco Railroad, and entertained dignitaries in the Susie Belle, the former Frisco President's Car which had been declared surplus in 1958. Burge left Frontier City in 1961, and Williams followed in 1975.

New management (1981–1987)
In fall 1981, the Tierco Group, a local real estate company, bought the park with plans to dismantle it and develop the land. However, the oil crunch slowed down the local real estate boom and the startled company found itself with a sagging amusement park to operate. The president of the company realized Oklahoma City needed a local amusement park but also knew that throwing a few million dollars at the park was not going to be enough to solve its problems. In 1983, the owners hired a management company to operate it. Gary Story was named the general manager in 1984.

Tierco Group/Premier Parks/Six Flags era (1987–2006)
In 1987, the contract with the management company was not renewed, but the management staff went to work directly for the park owners, Frontier City Properties, a wholly owned subsidiary of the Tierco Group, Inc.

In 1995, The Tierco Group, Inc. changed its name to Premier Parks. On February 9, 1998, it was announced that Premier Parks would purchase the Six Flags chain from Time Warner for $1.9 billion and change its name to Six Flags, Inc. The world headquarters for Six Flags was located at the southeast corner of the park's property until 2006, when the company's offices were moved to New York City and Grand Prairie, Texas.

On January 27, 2006, Six Flags put Frontier City and White Water Bay, Six Flags Magic Mountain, Elitch Gardens, Darien Lake, a couple of water parks and Wild Waves/Enchanted Village for sale. At the same time, they also announced their plan to close its corporate offices in Oklahoma City and move to New York City and Grand Prairie, Texas. Mark Shapiro, Six Flags CEO at that time, said that he expected the parks to continue operation after the sale, but rumors surfaced that some of them could close. The announcement also created a lot of confusion in the Oklahoma City market. Many people misunderstood the announcement, instead thinking that Frontier City was shutting down and relocating to New York.

CNL Properties and PARC Management era (2007–2010)
On January 11, 2007, Six Flags opted to keep Magic Mountain, but then announced that it would sell Frontier City and White Water Bay, along with Elitch Gardens, Darien Lake, Splashtown (near Houston) and Wild Waves/Enchanted Village to PARC 7F-Operations. As a part of the deal, the Six Flags prefix was removed from Elitch Gardens and Darien Lake. Frontier City and White Water Bay were never branded as Six Flags parks. PARC sold them to CNL Income Properties, Inc. and the two companies set up a long-term agreement in which CNL would lease the parks to PARC, which would operate them.

In 2008, a new suspended roller coaster, Steel Lasso, was added to celebrate the park's 50th anniversary.

On November 24, 2010, CNL Lifestyle Properties, Inc. announced that it had reached an agreement to terminate PARC's lease of the park and up to 17 other locations due to PARC defaulting on its contractual lease and loan obligations. The move came after, according to their 2010 SEC filings, PARC defaulted on their lease obligations on the properties. Five of the original six parks originally purchased from Six Flags are also involved in the lease termination.

Premier Parks, LLC era (2011–2016)
In 2011, it was announced that as the result of an agreement with owner CNL Lifestyle Properties, former Six Flags executives Kieran Burke and Gary Story would begin managing the properties as Premier Parks, LLC.

In 2012 a new multi-million dollar water play structure was erected in a former parking lot. The area is called Wild West Water Works and features seven slides, a 1,000 gallon tipping water bucket and hundreds of water gadgets.

In 2014, the park turned to Plainview, Texas-based Larson International for the new Winged Warrior ride and again in 2015 for the new Brain Drain, a seven-story looping thrill ride.

Another new attraction was added in 2016 called The Gunslinger, a 60-foot-tall spinning thrill ride made by Italian ride manufacturer, Zamperla. It was relocated from Magic Spring in Hot Springs, Arkansas, a park also owned by CNL Lifestyle Properties, Inc. 2016 also celebrated the 25th anniversary of the Wildcat. Much of the ride was re-tracked in 2016 to make for a smoother ride.

EPR Properties/Premier Parks era (2016–2018)
After the 2016 season the park was again sold, this time to EPR Properties which was operating it under the name Frontier City Holdings LLC. Premier Parks continued as the management company, with Stephen Ball continuing to act as its general manager.

For the 2017 season the Wildcat received a complete train makeover with rebuilt cars which includes new lap bars as well as a new color scheme of dark blue from its previous red. A new million dollar water ride was added to the Wild West Waterworks called the Gully Washer which consists of three high-thrill water slides that will start from a tower, approximately 66 feet tall. One of the new shows for the 2017 season performed in the Opera House is called "Shake, Rattle, and Roll", which replaced the show "Industrial Movement" and revisited the music of the 1950s and 1960s.

EPR Properties/Six Flags era (2018–present)
On May 22, 2018, Six Flags Entertainment Corporation announced that they had entered into a purchase agreement with Premier Parks to acquire the lease rights to operate the park, which would remain under EPR Properties ownership.

Before the start of the 2020 season, Six Flags suspended all operations across all their properties due to the COVID-19 pandemic. After over two months of the park operations being closed, Frontier City became the first park in the company to reopen on June 5, with new health and safety protocols. As of June 2020, Frontier City operations have resumed.

Special events
The park hosts concerts every summer at the Starlight Amphitheater.

Fright Fest
In 2018, Frontier City debuted "Fright Fest", which had previously been an annual event at the park until 2007. After Six Flags sold the park in 2007, the event was named "FrightFest" without the space to avoid legal issues.

Holiday in the Park
In 2018, Frontier City debuted "Holiday in the Park", a Christmas event with lights and entertainment throughout the park. The event added 27 operating days between November and January, a first for the park. Prior to Six Flags' re-acquisition of the park in May 2018, the event was to be named "A Frontier Christmas". It didn’t return in 2022 based on the park website.

Rides and attractions

Roller coasters

Thrill Rides

Family Rides

Kids' Rides

Water Park Rides

Former Rides

References

External links

 Frontier City Official Website
 
  Frontier City on Oklahoma Tourism Website

 
Amusement parks in Oklahoma
Western (genre) theme parks
Buildings and structures in Oklahoma City
Tourist attractions in Oklahoma City
Former PARC Management theme parks
Premier Parks, LLC
Companies based in Oklahoma City
Amusement parks opened in 1958
1958 establishments in Oklahoma
Six Flags amusement parks
Companies that filed for Chapter 11 bankruptcy in 2009